Pseudosimochromis marginatus is a species of cichlid endemic to Lake Tanganyika in East Africa. It prefers shallow waters with rock rubble substrates. It can reach a length of  TL.  It can also be found in the aquarium trade.

References

marginatus
Fish of the Democratic Republic of the Congo
Endemic fauna of the Democratic Republic of the Congo
Fish of Lake Tanganyika
Cichlid fish of Africa
Fish described in 1956
Taxa named by Max Poll
Taxonomy articles created by Polbot
Taxobox binomials not recognized by IUCN